In computer science, DPLL(T) is a framework for determining the satisfiability of SMT problems. The algorithm extends the original SAT-solving DPLL algorithm with the ability to reason about an arbitrary theory T. At a high level, the algorithm works by transforming an SMT problem into a SAT formula where atoms are replaced with Boolean variables. The algorithm repeatedly finds a satisfying valuation for the SAT problem, consults a theory solver to check consistency under the domain-specific theory, and then (if a contradiction is found) refines the SAT formula with this information.

Many modern SMT solvers, such as Microsoft's Z3 Theorem Prover, use DPLL(T) to power their core solving capabilities.

References 

Automated theorem proving
SAT solvers
Constraint programming